Jorge L. Bonnet (born 11 May 1965) is a Puerto Rican judoka and bobsledder who competed at five Olympic Games. He competed in judo at the 1984 and 1988 Summer Olympics, and in bobsleigh at the 1992, 1994, and 1998 Winter Olympics.

External links
 Sports-Reference Profile

1965 births
Living people
Puerto Rican male judoka
Puerto Rican male bobsledders
Judoka at the 1984 Summer Olympics
Judoka at the 1988 Summer Olympics
Bobsledders at the 1992 Winter Olympics
Bobsledders at the 1994 Winter Olympics
Bobsledders at the 1998 Winter Olympics
Olympic judoka of Puerto Rico
Olympic bobsledders of Puerto Rico
20th-century Puerto Rican people
21st-century Puerto Rican people